The blackstripe herring (Lile nigrofasciata) is a species of tropical sardine found in the Tropical Eastern Pacific, first documented in a coastal lagoon near Sonora, Mexico. Its diet consists of pelagic crustaceans, zooplankton, fish larvae, and fish eggs. It is typically found in muddy or sandy shores and high-salinity estuaries at depths of 0-10 meters.

References

blackstripe herring
Fish of the Gulf of California
blackstripe herring